The 2019–20 First Football League of Kosovo season is the 21st season of second-tier football in Kosovo. The season began on 23 August 2019. Due to the COVID-19 pandemic the league was suspended on 9 March 2020. On 27 May 2020 the league was cancelled by the FFK with no relegated teams and Besa Peje and Arberia are promoted to the Superliga.

Team changes
The following teams have changed division since the 2018–19 season.

Stadiums

League table

References

First Football League of Kosovo
Kosovo
2